Carlos Obed Ortiz Baerga (born November 4, 1968) is a Puerto Rican former Major League Baseball player. Baerga was known for his superb hitting abilities during his first stint with the Cleveland Indians in the early-to-mid-1990s, accumulating impressive batting statistics, earning three All-Star appearances (1992, 1993, 1995), two Silver Slugger Awards (1993, 1994), and making key contributions to the Indians' 1995 postseason run. He was considered one of Major League Baseball's hardest-hitting middle infielders by 1995 with his superb bat speed and switch-hitting power. After spending most of his career as a second baseman, he was used at various positions late in his career.  Baerga was elected into the Indians Hall of Fame in 2013.

Baseball career

Cleveland Indians
On November 4, at the age of sixteen, Baerga was signed by the San Diego Padres. As a 17-year-old he debuted for their Class A affiliate Charleston Rainbows. He played with the team for two seasons. On December 6, San Diego traded him to the Cleveland Indians along with Sandy Alomar Jr. and Chris James in exchange for established power-hitter Joe Carter. Baerga debuted as a major league baseball player with the Indians, on April 14, . That year, he played mostly as a third baseman and shortstop and would hit 17 doubles and seven home runs, while averaging .260 at the plate.

In 1992, he reached 200 hits in one season for the first time, getting 205 hits that year. In 1993, he duplicated the mark of 200 hits, with exactly 200.

He was a 3-time All Star in the 1992, 1993, and 1994 seasons.

The switch-hitting Baerga was the first of three players to have ever hit one home run from both sides of the plate in the same inning. He did so on April 8, 1993, at Cleveland Municipal Stadium against New York Yankees pitchers Steve Howe and Steve Farr in the game's 7th inning. On August 29, he was joined by Chicago Cubs utility player Mark Bellhorn, who completed the feat against the Milwaukee Brewers, and on July 30, 2012, Kendrys Morales became the third player to accomplish this rare feat against the Texas Rangers.

During the strike-shortened  season, Baerga hit 19 home runs and maintained an average of .314 at the plate. 
In the 144-game  season, Baerga had 175 hits and 15 home runs in 139 games, with a .314 average. The Indians made it to the World Series, where they fell to the Atlanta Braves in six games (Baerga flew out to Marquis Grissom for the final out).

He collected 129 hits with twelve home runs that year, hitting only .193 after being traded to the Mets. He ended that year with an average of .254. He was granted free agency on October 26, 1998.

Decline and retirement
Baerga began to develop problems with his knees. On January 27, Baerga was signed by the St. Louis Cardinals and released before the season began.  The Cincinnati Reds signed him, but after he hit .290 in the minors, released him midseason. The San Diego Padres put him in the minors for 21 games where he hit .286, and brought him up for 33 games where he hit .250. Bought by Cleveland in August, he hit .228 in 31 games with them.

He felt that he could no longer perform as a major leaguer. In 2001, he signed with the Seattle Mariners but was released during spring training. In , he played for the Long Island Ducks and in the Korea Baseball Organization, Samsung Lions(삼성 라이온즈 야구단)). Then he retired, and bought the Santurce Crabbers, becoming player-manager and realizing his childhood dream.

In 2013, Baerga was elected into the Indians Hall of Fame.

Return to major leagues
In 2002, Baerga returned to the majors. That year, he got 52 hits with the Boston Red Sox, primarily serving as a pinch-hitter and designated hitter. In , he was traded to the Arizona Diamondbacks, where he collected 71 hits for the team. He was signed by the Washington Nationals to a minor league contract before the  season and played 93 games for them. He also played for Puerto Rico in the 2006 World Baseball Classic.

Baerga collected 1,543 hits in his MLB career, with 134 home runs, 774 RBI and a .291 batting average.

As a broadcaster, Baerga has enjoyed prominence as a color commentator for Monday Night Baseball retransmissions in Spanish on ESPN Dos for the Mexico-Caribbean-Venezuela region. He is an analyst on Beisbol Esta Noche (the Spanish version of Baseball Tonight) on ESPN Deportes and ESPN Latin America. He is recognized by fans and fellow co-workers as "Carlos Obed".

2013 World Baseball Classic

During the 2013 World Baseball Classic, Baerga served as one of the assistant coaches under Edwin Rodríguez.

2013–2014: Manager for the Indios de Mayagüez

As of January 2014, Baerga is the current manager for the Indios de Mayagüez in Puerto Rico's Roberto Clemente Professional Baseball League.

Personal life
Baerga's son, Carlos Jr., is also a professional baseball player.

See also

 List of Major League Baseball players from Puerto Rico
 List of Major League Baseball single-game hits leaders
 List of Puerto Ricans

References

External links

American League All-Stars
Arizona Diamondbacks players
Boston Red Sox players
Cleveland Indians players
New York Mets players
San Diego Padres players
Washington Nationals players
Major League Baseball second basemen
Colorado Springs Sky Sox players
Indianapolis Indians players
Las Vegas Stars (baseball) players
Tucson Sidewinders players
Long Island Ducks players
Puerto Rican expatriate baseball players in South Korea
Samsung Lions players
Major League Baseball broadcasters
Major League Baseball players from Puerto Rico
Sportspeople from San Juan, Puerto Rico
1968 births
Living people
Silver Slugger Award winners
Cangrejeros de Santurce (baseball) players
Charleston Rainbows players
Lobos de Arecibo players
Wichita Pilots players